Give a Glimpse of What Yer Not is the eleventh studio album by alternative rock band Dinosaur Jr. It was announced on May 24 and was released on August 5, 2016. The music video for first single "Tiny" was released on June 20. The second single, "Goin Down", was released on July 27. The name of the album is taken from the line of the "Knocked Around" lyrics.

Critical reception
{{Album ratings
|MC= 80/100
| rev1 = Allmusic
| rev1score = 
| rev2 = The A.V. Club
| rev2score = A−
| rev3 = Exclaim!
| rev3score = 7/10
| rev4 = Mojo
| rev4score = | rev5 = Paste| rev5score = 8.7/10
| rev6 = Pitchfork| rev6Score = 7.5/10
| rev7 = PopMatters| rev7score = 
| rev8 = Rolling Stone| rev8score = 
| rev9 = Slant Magazine| rev9score = 
| rev10 = Spin| rev10score = 7/10
}}Give a Glimpse of What Yer Not received positive reviews from critics upon its release. At Metacritic, which assigns a normalized rating out of 100 to reviews from mainstream publications, the album received an average score of 80, based on 31 reviews, indicating "generally favorable reviews". Writing for Exclaim!'', Ian Gormely praised the band's ability to "push the boundaries of their sound without tarnishing their own legacy."

Accolades

Track listing
All songs written by J Mascis except as noted.

Charts

Personnel 
Dinosaur Jr.
J Mascis – lead vocals, guitars, producer, writer (1–4, 6–10)
Lou Barlow – bass, vocals (tracks 5, 11)
Murph – drums, percussion
Technical
 Daniel Richter – artwork
Miles Johnson – design
Justin Pizzoferrato – sound engineer
Marc Seedorf – sound engineer
Mark Miller – sound engineer
Mike McKoy – layout 
Serling Rooks Ferrara McKoy & Worob, LLP – layout 
7S Management – management
Amy Abrams – management
Brian Schwartz – management
East Bay Biz – management (business dealings)
Marcia Hyman – management (business dealings)
Greg Calbi – mastering
Ray Janos – mastering
John Agnello – mixing
Recorded at Bisquiteen
Mastered at Sterling Sound
Mixed at Bisquiteen

References

2016 albums
Dinosaur Jr. albums
Jagjaguwar albums